Namie Amuro So Crazy Tour Featuring Best Singles 2003–2004 is Namie Amuro's fifth concert tour to be released to DVD. Filmed in January 2004 in Tokyo International Forum A, the DVD captured a tour to date spanning seven months and three countries.

Track listing 
 Opening
 Put 'Em Up
 Shine More
 Respect the Power of Love
 I Have Never Seen
 Something 'bout the Kiss / No More Tears / Dreaming I was Dreaming
 Please Smile Again
 I Will
 "Uh Uh,,,,,,"
 Toi et Moi
 Wishing on the Same Star
 Love 2000 / How to Be a Girl / Chase the Chance
 Think of Me
 Sweet 19 Blues
 So Crazy
 Band Introduce
 Body Feels Exit
 Dancer Introduce
 You're My Sunshine
 A Walk in the Park
 Say the Word
 Can You Celebrate?
 Don't Wanna Cry
 Never End
 Ending

Personnel
Numbers in parentheses following listed names corresponded to the track list
Artist
Namie Amuro
Choreographer
Warner
Band
 Ken Kawamura - Keyboards
 Ken Kimura - Guitar
 Kenji Sano - Bass
 Mitsuru Kurauchi - Drums
Dancer
Mayumi
Megumi
Nazuki
Rika
Ryo
Shige
Subaru
Tetsuharu

Charts 
Album - Oricon DVD Sales Chart (Japan)

Namie Amuro video albums
2004 video albums
Music video compilation albums
2004 compilation albums